The 2004 Italian motorcycle Grand Prix was the fourth round of the 2004 MotoGP Championship. It took place on the weekend of 4–6 June 2004 at the Mugello Circuit.

MotoGP classification
The race, scheduled to be run for 23 laps, was stopped after 17 full laps due to rain. It was later restarted for the remaining 6 laps, with the grid determined by the running order before the suspension. The second part of the race determined the final result.

250 cc classification

125 cc classification

Championship standings after the race (motoGP)

Below are the standings for the top five riders and constructors after round four has concluded.

Riders' Championship standings

Constructors' Championship standings

 Note: Only the top five positions are included for both sets of standings.

References

Italian motorcycle Grand Prix
Italian
Motorcycle Grand Prix